Muhammad Ayub Sheikh is a Pakistani politician who was a member of the National Assembly of Pakistan from 2008 to 2013.

Political career
He was elected to the National Assembly of Pakistan from Constituency NA-254 (Karachi-XVI) as a candidate of Muttahida Qaumi Movement (MQM) in 2008 Pakistani general election. He received 132,648 votes and defeated Syed Suhail Abrar, a candidate of Pakistan Peoples Party (PPP).

References

Living people
Pakistani MNAs 2008–2013
Muttahida Qaumi Movement MNAs
Year of birth missing (living people)